NonStop Television was a Scandinavian television company, part of Turner Broadcasting System, packaging and distributing a number of specialty channels, mostly to the Scandinavian region. The company is a part of Millennium Media Group. The first channel, now a Nordic version of E!, launched in September 2000.

The channels that was owned or distributed by NonStop Television are:
Star! Scandinavia, entertainment channel with a name licensed by CTVglobemedia (formerly CHUM Limited) with most of its content taken from CTVglobemedia channels. Broadcasting to the Nordic countries, Baltic countries and Benelux.
Showtime Scandinavia, action movie channel. The name is licensed by Showtime Networks, Inc., but the channels share no content. Available in the Nordic countries.
Mezzo, a French language music channel owned by Lagardère Networks International, distributed by NonStop in the Nordic region.
Silver, "quality" movie channel. Targeting the Nordic countries.
Voom HD, a high-definition channel made up of content from the different channels owned by Voom. Broadcasting to the Nordic and Baltic countries.
Luxe TV HD, a high-definition "luxury" channel owned by Lagardère Networks International, distributed by NonStop to the Nordic and Baltic countries.
TNT7, a Scandinavian version of TNT, previously named TV7 (Sweden).

References

External links
 NonStop Television's website

Mass media companies of Sweden
Television in Denmark